Cécile Pozzo di Borgo (born 4 January 1952) is a French diplomat and politician.

Early life
Pozzo di Borgo was born as Cécile Marie Thérèse Mouton-Brady on 4 January 1952 in the 16th arrondissement of Paris, with roots from the Basque Country. She is the daughter of diplomat Jean Mouton-Brady, and she spent her childhood in various European countries. She is an alumnus of the École Nationale des Chartes and paleographer archivist (class of 1975).

Career
Pozzo de Borgo was the first curator of diplomatic archives at the Ministry of Foreign Affairs (1975-1987). In 1987, she became a technical adviser to Bernard Bosson, Minister Delegate for European Affairs. Then, in 1992, she was appointed adviser to the French Embassy in Belgium, and in 1998, head of the International Affairs Department in the Raw Materials Department of the Secretariat of State to Industry. From 2000 to 2002, she was deputy director of Communication, then deputy director of Communication and Information and Deputy Spokesperson of the Ministry of Foreign Affairs. She also served as Ambassador of France to the Dominican Republic (2005-2008) and later Peru (2008-2011).

In November 2011, Pozzo di Borgo took up her duties as prefect of Aveyron, with an agenda that included inter-communality in the department, road junctions, and water supply for agricultural production. She served in this position until 2014. On 18 September 2014, she was appointed prefect of the French Southern and Antarctic Lands (TAAF), by presidential decree. On 20 February 2018, she asserted her pension rights. Her stint was marked by the arrival of L'Astrolabe. In May 2018, she officially retired from her position as prefect of TAAF.

For Pierre Jullien, from Le Monde, Pozzo di Borgo led an "atypical" career, being neither 'from the prefectural corps' nor 'out of the ENA'.

Personal life
Pozzo di Borgo is married to Alain Pozzo di Borgo, and they have three children. She is the sister-in-law of Philippe Pozzo di Borgo.

Awards
 
 Officer of the Ordre national du Mérite (2011)
 Officer of the Légion d'honneur (2016)
 Officer of the Ordre des Arts et des Lettres (2016)

References

1952 births
Living people
Officiers of the Légion d'honneur
Officers of the Ordre national du Mérite
Commanders of the Order of the Crown (Belgium)
Grand Crosses of the Order of the Sun of Peru
Grand Crosses with Silver Breast Star of the Order of Merit of Duarte, Sánchez and Mella
Prefects of Aveyron
Ambassadors of France to the Dominican Republic
Ambassadors of France to Peru
Prefects of the French Southern and Antarctic Lands
20th-century French diplomats
21st-century French diplomats
20th-century French women politicians
21st-century French women politicians
École Nationale des Chartes alumni